BAG family molecular chaperone regulator 4 is a protein that in humans is encoded by the BAG4 gene.

Function 

The protein encoded by this gene is a member of the BAG1-related protein family. BAG1 is an anti-apoptotic protein that functions through interactions with a variety of cell apoptosis and growth related proteins including BCL-2, Raf-protein kinase, steroid hormone receptors, growth factor receptors and members of the heat shock protein 70 kDa family. This protein contains a BAG domain near the C-terminus, which could bind and inhibit the chaperone activity of Hsc70/Hsp70. This protein was found to be associated with the death domain of tumor necrosis factor receptor type 1 (TNF-R1) and death receptor-3 (DR3), and thereby negatively regulates downstream cell death signaling. The regulatory role of this protein in cell death was demonstrated in epithelial cells which undergo apoptosis while integrin mediated matrix contacts are lost.

Interactions
BAG4 has been shown to interact with:
 APOBEC1,
 HSPA8,  and
 TNFRSF1A.

References

External links

Further reading

Co-chaperones